Khemanit Jamikorn, mostly known as Pancake, was born on 27 May 1988 in Bangkok. Khemanit is a Thai TV actress, singer and model. She won Thai Supermodel Contest 2004 and later won Model of the World 2004 in China.

Career
Pancake shot to fame in 2010 through the Channel 7 TV lakhon Thoe Kap Khao Lae Rak Khong Rao (เธอกับเขาและรักของเรา).

Since then Pancake has appeared in numerous other Thai television soap operas as well as TV commercials. She has received many awards and honours, including the Hua Ding Asian Artist Popularity Award held in 2012 in Beijing as well as the title of 'Favorite Female Artist of the Greater China Region'.

Filmography
Pancake began acting in the Thai lakhon industry in 2005 when she was barely seventeen. Her latest one, Rak Re, has not yet been released.

Films

Dramas

FilmographyMC 
 Television 
 2022 : Magic War สงครามมายากล ทุกวันพุธ เวลา 20.05 น. On Air Workpoint TV (กด 23) ร่วมกับ เกียรติ กิจเจริญ (เริ่มวันพุธที่ 2 มีนาคม 2565)

 Online 
 2021 : PAN STORY 2021 EP1 On Air YouTube:Pancake Khemanit Official Channel

Awards and nominations

References

External links

 
 Facebook – Pancake Khemanit Official – Public Figure
 Pancake Khemanit – Jamikorn (Official Fanpage)
 China Fan of Pancake

1988 births
Living people
Khemanit Jamikorn
Khemanit Jamikorn
Khemanit Jamikorn
Khemanit Jamikorn
Khemanit Jamikorn
Khemanit Jamikorn
Khemanit Jamikorn
Thai television personalities
Khemanit Jamikorn
Khemanit Jamikorn
Khemanit Jamikorn